Army Institute of Technology is an engineering college located in Pune, Maharashtra, India. It is affiliated to the University of Pune. Only wards of army personnel are admitted in this institute. AIT is operated by the Army Welfare Education Society (AWES) and has the Chief of Army Staff of the Indian Army (COAS), as the president of its board of governors.

Governance 
AIT has a one-tier governance structure. At the highest level is the Board of Governors with the COAS as president, and the VCOAS and all Army Commanders (except the General Officer Commanding-in-Chief, South Western Command) as Vice Presidents. The managing director of AWES is designated as the Member Secretary, with the following officers being Members: DCOAS (IS & T), DCOAS (P & S), Adjutant General (AG), Quartermaster General (QMG), Master General Ordnance (MGO), Military secretary (MS), Engineer-in-Chief, three Heads of Arms/Services in rotation, Director General (Discipline, Ceremonials & Welfare) and the Judge Advocate General (JAG).
This is followed by a twelve-member Governing Body, which includes nominees from AICTE, the University of Pune and the Government of Maharashtra, and a ten-member Local Managing Committee, which includes representatives from each of the teaching faculties.

Rankings

Army Institute of Technology was ranked 172 among engineering colleges by the National Institutional Ranking Framework (NIRF) in 2022.

References 

Colleges affiliated to Savitribai Phule Pune University
Engineering colleges in Pune
1994 establishments in Maharashtra
Educational institutions established in 1994